World's Worst Tenants is an American television series on Spike. It premiered on June 12, 2012. The eviction specialists are Todd Howard, Rick Moore and Randye Howard. Though billed as a reality program, it does not document actual events; the show's producers admit that the program depicts "reenactments of many of the actual confrontations that Howard and his team have experienced". The program does not make it clear until the closing credits that the events depicted are in fact reenactments. On November 13, 2012, Spike announced that the series has been renewed for a second season which debuted on March 12, 2013.

Premise
The half-hour show follows three property-eviction specialists as they forcibly remove problem tenants from residential, commercial and retail units. The viewers are taken behind the scenes of the disputes between landlords and tenants. Episodes have included a portly man stuck in a bathtub, a man operating a sweatshop in his garage and an elderly woman with over 20 cannabis plants in a room.

Episodes

Series overview

Season 1 (2012)

Season 2 (2013)

References

External links
 

2010s American reality television series
2012 American television series debuts
English-language television shows
Spike (TV network) original programming